Cleona Township is a township in Scott County, Iowa, USA.  As of the 2000 census, its population was 509.

Geography

Transportation
Cleona Township contains one airport or landing strip, Workman Airfield.

References
 USGS Geographic Names Information System (GNIS)

External links
 US-Counties.com
 City-Data.com

Townships in Scott County, Iowa
Townships in Iowa